Shannon Evans (born 16 December 1993) is an Australian professional rugby league footballer. She previously played for the Newcastle Knights in the NRL Women's Premiership.

Background
Evans was born in Newcastle, New South Wales. She joined the Australian Navy as a 19-year old.

Playing career

Early years
As an 18-year old, Evans played for the Maitland Women's team. In 2018, she played for the Australian Defence Force representative side. In 2019, she played for the Canterbury-Bankstown Bulldogs in the NSWRL Women's Premiership. In 2021, she played for the Central Coast Roosters and represented the Australian Defence Force side again.

2022
In February, Evans joined the Newcastle Knights' inaugural NRLW squad. In round 5 of the delayed 2021 NRL Women's season, she made her NRLW debut for the Knights against the Gold Coast Titans. She played in 1 match for the Knights, before parting ways with the club at the end of the season.

References

External links
Newcastle Knights profile

1993 births
Australian female rugby league players
Newcastle Knights (NRLW) players
Rugby league fullbacks
Rugby league five-eighths
Rugby league hookers
Living people